Giorgio Lingua (born 23 March 1960) is an Italian prelate of the Catholic Church who has worked in the diplomatic service of the Holy See since 1992. He was named Apostolic Nuncio to Croatia on 22 July 2019. He was previously nuncio in Iraq, Jordan and Cuba.

Biography
He was born on 23 March 1960 in Fossano, in the province of Cuneo, Italy, in 1960. He was ordained on 10 November 1984. He earned a doctorate in canon law. To prepare for a diplomat’s career, he completed the course of study at the Pontifical Ecclesiastical Academy in 1988.

He entered the diplomatic service of the Holy See on 1 July 1992. He worked in the papal representations in the Ivory Coast and the United States, and in the Section for Relations with States of the Secretariat of State as well as in the apostolic nunciatures in Italy and in Serbia.

On 4 September 2010, Pope Benedict XVI named him the Apostolic Nuncio to Iraq and Jordan as well as Titular Archbishop of Tuscania. He received his episcopal consecration from Tarcisio Bertone on 9 October 2010.

Asked about the 2014 US airstrikes in response to the advance of ISIS, Lingua said: "This is something that had to be done, otherwise [the Islamic State] could not be stopped. But, we should wonder why we have arrived at this point: was it not a lack of intelligence? Were we not able to understand what was going on? And then: who gave these [Islamic State fighters] such sophisticated weapons?"

On 17 March 2015, Pope Francis named him Apostolic Nuncio to Cuba.

On 22 July 2019, Francis named him Apostolic Nuncio to Croatia.

See also
 List of heads of the diplomatic missions of the Holy See

References

External links

Living people
1960 births
Pontifical Ecclesiastical Academy alumni
21st-century Italian Roman Catholic titular archbishops
Apostolic Nuncios to Cuba
Apostolic Nuncios to Iraq
Apostolic Nuncios to Jordan
Apostolic Nuncios to Croatia